The Children's Book of the Year Award: Older Readers has been presented annually since 1946 by the Children's Book Council of Australia (CBCA). Note: from 1946 to 1986 this award was known as "Book of the Year".

The Award "will be made to outstanding books of fiction, drama, or poetry which require of the reader a degree of maturity to appreciate the topics, themes and scope of emotional involvement.  Generally, books in this category will be appropriate in style and content for readers in their secondary years of schooling."

Award winners

1940s

1950s

1960s

1970s

1980s

1990s

2000s

2010s

2020s

Commended books

1940s

1950s

1960s

1970s

See also 

 List of CBCA Awards
 List of Australian literary awards

External links
 CBCA Awards History

References

Awards established in 1982
Children's Book Council of Australia
1982 establishments in Australia
Children's literary awards
English-language literary awards